Closing credits or end credits are a list of the cast and crew of a particular motion picture, television program, or video game. Where opening credits appear at the beginning of a work, closing credits appear close to, or at the very end of a work. A full set of credits can include the cast and crew, but also production sponsors, distribution companies, works of music licensed or written for the work, various legal disclaimers, such as copyright and more. 

Typically, the closing credits appear in white lettering on a solid black background, often with a musical background. Credits are either a series of static frames, or a single list that scrolls from the bottom of the screen to the top. Occasionally closing credits will divert from this standard form to scroll in another direction, include illustrations, extra scenes, bloopers, joke credits, or post-credits scenes.

The use of closing credits in film to list complete production crew and the cast was not firmly established in American film until the late 1960s and early 1970s. Films generally had opening credits only, which consisted of just major cast and crew, although sometimes the names of the cast and the characters they played would be shown at the end. Two of the first major films to contain extensive closing credits – but almost no opening credits – were the blockbusters Around the World in 80 Days (1956) and West Side Story (1961). West Side Story showed only the title at the beginning of the film, and Around the World in 80 Days had no opening credits at all.

See also

External links 
 Credits, branding & trademarks guidelines of the BBC
 Opening and Closing Credits PDF
 Credit Positioning PDF

Film scenes
Film and video terminology
Television terminology